Keyed Up is the fifteenth studio album by American country music artist Ronnie Milsap, released in 1983. It featured the No. 5 country chart hit "Stranger in My House", plus the No. 1 country hits "Don't You Know How Much I Love You" and "Show Her".

Track listing

Personnel
Acoustic guitar: Jimmy Capps, Jack Watkins
Background Vocals: Robert Byrne, Bruce Dees, Sherri Huffman, Ronnie Milsap, Suzy Storm, Dan Seals, Lisa Silver, Diane Tidwell, Marie Tomlinson, Barbara Wyrick
Bass guitar: Warren Gowers, David Hungate
Drums: Roger Hawkins, Larrie Londin, James Stroud
Electric guitar: Larry Byrom, Bruce Dees, Jon Goin, Fred Newell
Horns: The Nashville Horn Works
Keyboards: David Briggs, Shane Keister, Ronnie Milsap, Bobby Ogdin
Lead Vocals: Ronnie Milsap
Steel guitar: Sonny Garrish
Strings: The Nashville String Machine
String Arranger: D. Bergen White
Synthesizer: Shane Keister, Ronnie Milsap

Chart performance

Ronnie Milsap albums
1983 albums
RCA Records albums
Albums produced by Tom Collins (record producer)